Funiculaire de St-Luc - Tignousa is a funicular railway in the Anniviers valley, Valais, Switzerland. The line leads from St-Luc at 1680 m to Tignousa at 2180 m. It provides access to the skiing area St-Luc-Chandolin and also operates in summer season. The line has a length of 1300 m and a difference of elevation of 500 m.

It was built in 1994 replacing an aerial cableway from 1964. An initial concession for 20 years had been granted by the Swiss Federal Assembly in December 1993 with federal councilor Adolf Ogi supporting it before the Council of States.

The funicular is owned and operated by "Funiculaire St-Luc - Chandolin SA" (named Funiculaire St-Luc - Bella-Tola SA 1993–1999 before the merger with Télé Chandolin Anniviers SA Chandolin; earlier Télésiège St-Luc Bella-Tola SA).

References  

St-Luc
Transport in Valais
1200 mm gauge railways in Switzerland
Railway lines opened in 1994
Anniviers